Pir Gheyb-e Bala (also Romanized as Pīr Gheyb-e Bālā; also known as Pīr Gheyb) is a village in Anduhjerd Rural District, Shahdad District, Kerman County, Kerman Province, Iran. At the 2006 census, its population was 77, in 15 families.

References 

Populated places in Kerman County